Kastrup station is a rapid transit station of the Copenhagen Metro, located in the Kastrup section of Tårnby. It opened on 28 September 2007.

The station serves the M2 line. It is located in fare zone 4. It serves the residential area of Kastrup, while another station further south connects the metro to Kastrup Airport and the Øresund Railway.

External links
 Kastrup station on www.m.dk 
 Kastrup station on www.m.dk 

M2 (Copenhagen Metro) stations
Railway stations opened in 2007
Railway stations in Denmark opened in the 21st century